Affoltern may refer to the following places in Switzerland:

Affoltern am Albis, in the Canton of Zürich
Affoltern im Emmental, in the Canton of Bern
Affoltern (Zürich), part of the city of Zürich: 
Grossaffoltern, in the Canton of Bern